The Lists of rivers of U.S. insular areas include:

 List of rivers of Guam
 List of rivers of Hawaii
 List of rivers of Puerto Rico
 List of rivers of the United States Virgin Islands

See also
 List of rivers of the United States